The Predator, also known as Yautja (pronounced ), is the titular extraterrestrial species featured in the Predator science fiction franchise, characterized by its trophy hunting of other species for sport. First introduced in the film of the same name, the creatures returned in the sequels Predator 2 (1990), Predators (2010) and The Predator (2018) (the latter two of which introducing the rival clan of Hish-Qu-Ten), and the prequel Prey (2022), as well as the crossover films Alien vs. Predator (2004) and Aliens vs. Predator: Requiem (2007).

The Predator has been the subject of numerous novels, video games and comic books, both on their own and as part of the Alien vs. Predator crossover imprint. The species have been called Predators and Hunters in the movies, while Yautja, and Hish-qu-Ten have been alternatively used in the expanded universe. Created by brothers Jim and John Thomas, the Predators are depicted as large, sapient and sentient humanoid creatures who possess advanced technology, such as active camouflage, directed-energy weapons, and interstellar travel. Both the Yautja and the Hish-Qu-Ten compete for a chance to enter the ritual of becoming "Blooded", a rank given to predators that have killed prey that has been deemed worthy, as well as select humans, in particular Lex Woods and Machiko Noguchi.

Concept and creation

Design 

The Predator design is credited to special effects artist Stan Winston. While flying to Japan with Aliens director James Cameron, Winston, who had been hired to design the Predator, was doing concept art on the flight. Cameron saw what he was drawing and said, "I always wanted to see something with mandibles." Winston then included them in his designs. Stan Winston's studio created all of the physical effects for Predator and Predator 2, creating the body suit for actor Kevin Peter Hall and the mechanical facial effects. The studio was hired after attempts to create a convincing monster (including Jean-Claude Van Damme wearing a much different body suit) had failed. Arnold Schwarzenegger recommended Winston after his experience working on The Terminator.

The Predator was originally designed with a long neck, a dog-like head, and a single eye. This design was abandoned when it became apparent that the jungle locations would make shooting the complex design too difficult. Originally, the studio contracted the makeup effects for the creature from Richard Edlund's Boss Film Creature Shop. However, problems filming the alien in Mexico led the makeup effects responsibilities to be given to Stan Winston. According to former Boss Films make-up supervisor Steve Johnson, the makeup failed because of an impractical design by McTiernan that included 12-inch leg extensions that gave the Predator a backward bent satyr-leg. The design did not work in jungle locations. After six weeks of shooting in the jungles of Palenque, Mexico, the production had to shut down so that Winston could make a new Predator. This took eight months and then filming resumed for five weeks, ending in February 1987.

Film portrayals 

Jean-Claude Van Damme was originally cast as the Predator; the idea was that the star's abilities in martial arts would make the Predator an agile, ninja-esque hunter.
With this first mantis-like costume, Van Damme had to walk on stilts because it had backward-bent reptilian legs and extended arms. But this was just too clumsy to handle on set, in the real jungle on muddy slopes of Mexico. It was virtually impossible to do physically. 

When compared with Schwarzenegger, Carl Weathers, and Jesse Ventura, actors known for their bodybuilding regimens, it became apparent that a more physically imposing man was needed to make the creature appear threatening. Eventually, Van Damme was removed from the film and replaced by actor and mime artist Kevin Peter Hall. Hall played the Predator in the first and second movies. Having been trained in the art of mime, he used many tribal dance moves in his performance, such as during the fight between Arnold Schwarzenegger and the Predator at the end of the first movie. The vocal effects of the Predator were provided by Peter Cullen, who made a clicking growl noise so he wouldn't strain his voice like he did in King Kong where he had to provide the uncredited vocal effects of the titular character.

In Predator 2, according to a "making of" featurette, Danny Glover suggested the Los Angeles Lakers to be the other Predators, because Glover was a big fan. Hall persuaded some of the Lakers to play background Predators, because they couldn't find anyone on short notice. Hall died not long after Predator 2 was released in theaters. The vocal effects of the Predators were provided by Hal Rayle.

Whyte returned to portray the "Wolf" Predator in Aliens vs. Predator: Requiem.

In Predators, actors Brian Steele and Carey Jones both portrayed a new breed of Predator known as the "Black Super Predators," who have been dropping humans on their planet for many years to play a survival game against them. In a nod to the first film, Derek Mears played the Predator as the creature appeared in the original, dubbed the "Classic Predator."

In The Predator, stuntman and parkour athlete Brian A. Prince, standing , portrays the title character, as a "standard" Predator that escapes to earth after stealing a weapon called "Predator Killer" and is being hunted down by a far larger genetically-enhanced Predator. The enhanced Predator is mostly CGI. However,  Canadian actor Kyle Strauts and Brian Prince served as stand-ins for the character on set.

In the prequel Prey, Dane DiLiegro performs the Predator. This Predator is a more primitive example of its species compared to the Predators featured in the original films, relying more on brute force and hand-to-hand combat when engaging its prey rather than the stealth-based attacks of its later kin. Its technology and weaponry similarly reflect this primitive approach, eschewing plasma-based projectiles in favor of metal spear tips and arrows, and its face mask is of a more bone-like material rather than the smooth steel of later examples of its species. The mask functions identically to the ones worn by the later visitors to Earth. While cosmetically different than the other members of the Yautja, its origin being from a different hemisphere on the Predator homeworld, it still adheres to the established honor code and spares those it doesn't deem a threat.

Special and make-up effects 

The Predator's blood was made from a combination of the liquid from glow sticks mixed with K-Y Jelly. The mixture loses its glow quickly, so new batches had to be quickly made between takes. The technique was used in all five films featuring the Predator.

The camouflage effect was designed by R/Greenberg Associates, under the direction of Joel Hynek. The idea for the effect came in a dream one of the Thomas brothers (who wrote the film) had, in which there was a chrome man who was inside a reflective sphere. The man blended in, perfectly camouflaged, reflecting from all directions and only visible when in motion. The effect was created by repeating an image in a pattern of ripples in the shape of the Predator's body. It proved very effective and was a new way of presenting an "invisible man". Before there was digital rendering technology, all of the camouflage was done optically using photo-chemical means, so that one would never get the same result twice from combining the same pieces of film.

After the original movies, Amalgamated Dynamics took over from Stan Winston Studio in creating the props for the Predators in the Alien vs. Predator film and a number of effects houses worked on the various other effects.

Characteristics 
As the film series has progressed, the creature's design has been modified in many ways, including differences in skin color and pattern and variations in the design of the masks and armor.

Appearance 

Predators are physically distinguished from humans by their greater height, arthropod-like mandibles and long, hair-like appendages on their heads that are set into their skulls (popularly perceived as "dreadlocks"). Their bodies are resilient to damage, capable of recovering from multiple gunshot wounds and radiation doses that would prove fatal to humans. Their wounds do, however, require medical attention and they incorporate a portable surgical kit in their armor for this purpose. They are also capable of enduring excruciating pain. Predators are much stronger than humans, easily capable of outmatching a conditioned adult human and shattering solid concrete with their bare hands. They are also skilled climbers and will readily move through trees or across rooftops in pursuit of prey. Though capable of surviving exposure in Antarctic temperatures for an extended period of time, it is implied that Predators have a preference for hot equatorial climates. Their blood is luminescent phosphor green in color. Their vision operates mainly in the infrared portion of the electromagnetic spectrum; they can easily detect heat differentials in their surroundings but are unable to easily distinguish among objects of the same relative temperature. A Predator bio-mask increases its ability to see in a variety of spectra, ranging from the low infrared to the high ultraviolet, and also filters the ambient heat from the area, allowing them to see things with greater clarity and detail. While they are capable of breathing Earth's atmosphere, the creature in Predator 2 is seen using a breathing mask after losing his helmet (although this Predator had just been shot multiple times and may have, therefore, not been operating at its full potential. A second possibility is that it was used to filter out impurities in the air— exhaust and such—which would not be found in more natural environments). Their dietary habits are also mentioned in Predator 2, where it is revealed that the creature regularly visits a slaughterhouse every two days to feed on the stored meat there.

Throughout their film appearances, Predators have undergone numerous design variations. In Predator 2, the main Predator was designed to look more urban and hip than its predecessor. Design changes included tribal ornamentation on the forehead, which was made steeper and shallower, brighter skin coloration and a greater number of fangs. This Predator was made less reliant on its plasma caster, and more cunning with the use of nets, spears and bladed weaponry. In Alien vs. Predator, the appearance of the Predators was redesigned to make them seem more heroic. Redesigns included a reduction in head and waist size, broader shoulders, a more muscular physique, piranha-like teeth on the upper jaw, and dryer and less clammy skin to further differentiate them from the Aliens. In Aliens vs. Predator: Requiem, the Predator was returned to the sleeker design concept prior to Alien vs. Predator. For the so-called "Black Super Predators" in Predators, the designers used the differences between a cassette tape and an iPod as an analogy in differentiating the new Predators from the classic. The Super Predators were designed as leaner and taller than the "classic" Predator design, and they have longer faces, tighter armor, and more swept back dreadlocks.

Culture and history 

Predator culture revolves around the hunting and stalking of dangerous lifeforms. After making a kill, Predators typically skin or decapitate the carcass, converting it into a trophy. If immobilized or at the brink of death, a hunter will activate the mass-explosive self-destruct-mechanism in his wristband, honorably erasing any trace of its presence to its prey. It is often alluded to that the reason Predators hunt is not for sustenance or elimination of threats, but as sportsmanship or rite of passage, as they will normally only attack life forms that have the ability to provide them with a challenge. In Predators, it is revealed that there are at least two different Predator tribes, which are engaged in a long-lasting blood feud. The film also introduced a pack of spined, quadrupedal beasts used as flushing dogs by the "Super Predators". Creature designer Greg Nicotero used hyenas as a basis for the creature's physique and the spines were added later by Chris Olivia.

Predators made contact with early human civilizations such as the Ancient Egyptians, the Khmer Empire, Aztecs, and the Comanche Nation, as well as a fictitious culture inhabiting what is now Bouvetøya. Upon arriving on Earth, the Predators were worshipped as gods by humans, and they taught many of the civilizations how to build pyramids (an explanation as to why many of these different ancient societies had distinctly similar cultures and architecture), but in return expected sacrifices of humans for use as hosts for huntable Xenomorphs (Aliens) — the ultimate prey for initiates. The Predators returned to Bouvetøya every century to consummate the bargain, until at one point in the ritual, the Xenomorphs spread out of control, resulting in the Predators detonating a bomb that obliterated the entire civilization. Relations between humans and Predators deteriorated from that time on; the Predators then viewed humans as little more than another quarry to hunt.

Predators feature prominently in the folklore of certain cultures; some Latin American people refer to the species as "El Diablo que hace trofeos de los hombres" (Spanish for "The Demon who makes trophies of men"), and Jamaican superstition identifies Predators as demons from the spirit world. When hunting humans, Predators normally avoid certain individuals such as children and some adults if they are unarmed, though they will spare armed ones if they happen to be pregnant or sickly unless they are attacked by them. A human who has managed to kill a Predator or a Xenomorph in single combat or has fought alongside a Predator is usually spared by the deceased hunter's comrades and given a gift (often a rare or exotic weapon) as a sign of respect.

A learner's first successful Alien hunt is completed with the marking of his helmet and forehead with the acidic blood of his kill. The hunter generally operates alone. Even when hunters appear in groups, they rarely perform anything that resembles teamwork. Predators use Aliens as prey, creating artificial gaming reserves by keeping Queens and even Facehuggers in captivity. It is shown in a brief scene in Aliens vs. Predator: Requiem that Predators have had prior contact with a race of creatures who resemble the "Space Jockey" in the film Alien. This was confirmed in the film's DVD commentary. Again, in the film Predators, when the group of the main protagonists enters the Predators' camp, there is a brief view of an Alien skull on the ground (as well as the lower jaw of an Alien on the helmet of the Berserker Predator).

Language 
The script of the Predators is expressed in the films and other media through written patterns of dashes. These written symbols appear on the creatures' gauntlet displays, their helmets, architecture, and many other surfaces. The most common vocalizations of the Predators consists of a series of clicks, roars, snarls, and growls which consist of recorded vocalizations of animals such as lions, tigers, leopards, jaguars, cougars, snow leopards, black bears, grizzly bears, dolphins, alligators, camels, and elephants. Predators will mimic human language on occasion, and have been shown to use their helmets to understand and speak human languages; some have also learned to speak human languages, even without the use of their helmets as well. Author Steve Perry designed a constructed language set for the Aliens vs. Predator novel series.

Appearances in media

Film anthology

Predator (1987)

First appearing in the 1987 film of the same name, the Predator arrives on Earth via starship to "hunt" armed and dangerous human quarry. Having landed in a Central American jungle that has had prior visitations, the creature has already killed a squad of U.S. Special Forces soldiers before beginning to hunt an elite paramilitary team sent to rescue what they were told are presidential cabinet ministers kidnapped by guerrilla forces. The Predator dispatches the team members one by one with its array of weaponry until Major Alan "Dutch" Schaefer (Arnold Schwarzenegger) is the last one left, unable to escape the area. Dutch eventually confronts the creature, after making preparations by covering himself in mud to hide his heat signature from the Predator's thermal imaging, and setting up numerous booby traps. Though he manages to disable the Predator's cloaking ability, the Predator manages to capture him, and then, in a display of honor, discards his mask and electronic weaponry before challenging Dutch to a final duel. Physically outmatched, Dutch eventually gets it into a position allowing him to use one of his traps to crush and mortally wound the creature. After being asked what he is by Dutch, the Predator mimics his question and sets off his self-destruct device before laughing maniacally, though Dutch manages to escape the explosion.

Predator 2  (1990)

Set in 1997, ten years after the events of the first film, the 1990 sequel follows a new Predator who sets his sights on Los Angeles during the summer due to the heat and fierce, deadly drug wars between Jamaican and Colombian cartels, as well as the L.A.P.D. attempting to fight both gangs (promotional material for the film said that this Predator was young and chose a densely populated urban area for a more ambitious hunt). Eliminating gang members from enforcers to leaders, the Predator also targets the L.A.P.D. officers attempting to investigate his handiwork, specifically Lieutenant Michael Harrigan (Danny Glover) and his three partners (Rubén Blades, María Conchita Alonso and Bill Paxton). Special agent Peter Keyes (Gary Busey), purportedly sent by the DEA to investigate cartels, but actually part of the secretive Outworld Life Forms task force, attempts to capture the Predator alive for government study, but he and most of his OWLF team are outsmarted and slaughtered by their quarry. Towards the end of the movie, the Predator is ultimately confronted by Harrigan in his own ship and killed when Harrigan uses one of his own weapons against him. The Predator's clan-mates de-cloak and carry away the dead Predator's body and give Harrigan a flintlock dating from 1715 as a sign of respect. The film also makes a reference to the Alien films, as shown in the Predators' trophy room, which has a skull closely resembling that of an Alien.

Alien vs. Predator (2004) 

In 2004, a buried pyramid on Bouvetøya, an island about one thousand miles north of Antarctica, giving off a "heat bloom", attracts a group of explorers led by billionaire and self-taught engineer Charles Bishop Weyland (Lance Henriksen), the original founder and CEO of Weyland Industries. Their investigation unknowingly activates an Alien egg production line as a hibernating Alien Queen is awakened within the pyramid. These events have all been orchestrated by Predators on a Predator mothership arriving in Earth orbit, as the pyramid is an ancient Predator training ground, where three Predators are to now fulfill a rite of passage. Descending down to the planet and entering the structure, they kill all humans in their way with the intention of hunting the newly-formed Aliens, while the explorers inside the pyramid are scattered, those who aren't killed by the Predators being captured alive by Aliens and implanted with embryos from the eggs of the Alien Queen. Two of the Predators die in the ensuing battle with an Alien. As the Aliens threaten to breed out of control, the remaining Predator allies itself with the lone surviving human, Alexa "Lex" Woods (Sanaa Lathan), while in their way out of the pyramid as it is destroyed by the Predator's wrist bomb. On the surface, they find the Alien Queen has survived and escaped, and are forced to battle against her. They defeat the Queen by chaining her to a water tower they topple into the ocean, dragging her down into the dark depths of the frozen sea, but not before she fatally wounds the last Predator. The Predator mothership uncloaks and the crew retrieves the fallen Predator. A Predator elder gives Lex a spear as a sign of respect, and then departs. Once in orbit it is revealed that an Alien Chestburster was present within the corpse, thus a Predalien hybrid is born.

Aliens vs. Predator: Requiem (2007) 

Set immediately after the events of the previous film, the Predalien hybrid aboard the Predator scout ship, having just separated from the mothership shown in the previous film, has grown to full adult size and sets about killing the Predators aboard the ship, causing it to crash in the small town of Gunnison, Colorado. The last surviving Predator activates a distress beacon containing a video recording of the Predalien, which is received by a veteran Predator on the Predator homeworld, who sets off towards Earth to "clean up" the infestation. When it arrives, the Predator tracks the Aliens into a section of the sewer below the town. He removes evidence of their presence as he moves along using a corrosive blue liquid and uses a laser net to try to contain the creatures in the sewer, but the Aliens still manage to escape into the town above, and the Predalien finds an opportunity to breed more drones at a hospital. The Predator hunts Aliens all across town, accidentally cutting the power to the town in the process. Over the course of several confrontations with Aliens and subsequently human survivors, the Predator ends up with one working plasma caster that cannot be fired. The Predator fixes this by fashioning it into a plasma pistol before losing it, after which human survivors find and use it to help them escape. The Predator then fights the Predalien singlehandedly, and the two mortally wound one another just as the US Air Force drops a tactical nuclear bomb on the town, incinerating both combatants along with the Predalien's warriors and hive, as well as the few remaining humans in the town. The salvaged plasma pistol is then taken to a Ms. Yutani of the Yutani Corporation, foreshadowing an advancement in technology leading to the future events of the Alien films.

Predators (2010) 

In Predators (which deliberately distances itself from the prior Alien vs. Predator films), it is revealed that there are two warring Predator tribes: a group of larger Predators who also make use of quadrupedal hunting beasts and elaborate traps to hunt, and the other group of regular size who hunt traditionally. An international group of soldiers and dangerous criminals from different locations on Earth are dropped by the large Predators onto a forested planet they use as a game reserve. After numerous skirmishes resulting in the deaths of two Predators and all but two of the group of humans, the last Predator manages to kill a member of his kind from his rival tribe, but is defeated in combat by the human survivors. The survivors then head off to seek a way off the planet and back to Earth, just in time to witness more people be dropped.

The Predator (2018) 

Continuing the existence of two Predator species, the film opens with a 'standard' Predator, being pursued through space, coming to Earth. After being forced to land in an escape pod it is captured by a government research division known as 'Operation Stargazer'. However, it soon escapes to find missing parts of its armor that were taken by army sniper Captain Quinn MacKenna, who encountered the Predator when it landed, and had mailed the items to himself before being detained by the same government program as part of covering the incident up. When these parts are discovered by Quinn's autistic son Rory, Rory is able to figure out how to translate the Predator language, just as MacKenna discovers the Predator has escaped and, finding where the armor pieces are, is now hunting his son. Joining forces with Doctor Casey Bracket—an evolutionary biologist brought in to study the Predator—and a group of soldiers suffering from various PTSD symptoms that he was being escorted with, MacKenna is able to rescue his son, only to discover the first Predator was being pursued when its pursuer, an alien from its rival tribe, arrives. The subsequent fighting results in the death of the first Predator, most of the Stargazer staff and the other soldiers in MacKenna's makeshift unit, but MacKenna, Rory and Casey are able to kill the giant Predator. The evidence throughout the film indicates the Predators have begun adapting themselves with human DNA, turning them into the new giant Predators, and intend to take Earth once humanity dies from climate change, and the first Predator was a traitor who came to Earth with a cybernetic suit that would allow humanity to more easily stand up to the Predators.

Prey (2022)

In the 2022 prequel Prey, a Predator visits Earth in 1719. This Predator relies more on brute force and hand-to-hand combat when engaging its prey, rather than the stealth-based attacks of its later kin. Its technology and weaponry reflect this approach, with the alien using more primitive versions of several weapons featured in previous films. It eschews plasma-based projectiles in favor of metal spear tips and arrows, and its face mask is of a more bone-like material rather than the smooth steel of later examples of its species. The mask functions similarly to those worn by the later visitors to Earth. Like its kin, the Predator still adheres to the established honor code, sparing those it doesn't deem a threat.

In the prequel, young Comanche hunter Naru battles the Predator, using a combination of live human bait, traps, terrain, and the Predator's very own weaponry against it. Victorious, she returns to her tribe with the creature's severed head as a trophy. She also holds a flintlock from 1715, connecting the film to the second in the franchise. Afterward, in an end credit sequence, it appears that more members of the Predator species have arrived on Earth, although their intentions are left unclear.

Expanded universe 
In the Aliens vs. Predator novel series (based on the Dark Horse Comics) by David Bischoff, Steve and Stephani Perry, the Predators, known in the series as "yautja," are depicted as living in a matriarchal clan-based society bearing similarities to a pack mentality whose strongest and most skilled of the group lead. The Predators are portrayed as sexually dimorphic mammals. It is also revealed that their blood has the capacity of partially neutralizing the acidity of Alien blood. Their religion is partially explored in the series, showing that they are polytheistic, and that their equivalent of the Grim Reaper is the so-called "Black Warrior," who is seen as an eternal adversary who eventually wins all battles.

In Randy Stradley's miniseries Aliens vs. Predator: War, it is revealed through the narration of the character Machiko Noguchi that Predators were responsible for the spread of Aliens throughout the galaxy, though the Predators deny this, stating that their large interplanetary distribution is due to simultaneous convergent evolution.

The comic series Predator and Aliens vs Predator: Three World War introduce a clan of Predators referred to as "Killers," who are enemies of mainstream Predators (here called "Hunters") because of their tradition of training Aliens as attack animals rather than hunting them, as well as their desire for killing as opposed to honorable hunting. The character Machiko Noguchi notes in issue #1 of Three World War that "You have to understand the mindset of the Hunters, and the honor they place on facing a worthy opponent on an equal footing ... a kill is the end result, but it's not the point of a hunt ... For the 'Killers', that wasn't the case. They were all about the killing." They are first seen in the 2009 Predator series, where a number interfere in an East African civil war, coming into conflict with both humans and their Hunter counterparts. By the time of Three World War the Killers are assumed to have been wiped out by the Hunters, but some survive and begin attacking human colonies, forcing Noguchi to forge an alliance between humans and the Hunters in order to deal with them.

In John Shirley's stand-alone novel Predator: Forever Midnight, Predators, now referred to as "Hish," are shown to possess a gland located between their neck and collarbone which secretes powerful hormones into their bloodstream and which drives them to hyper-aggression. When this gland is over-stimulated, it sends the creatures into a frenzied rage, causing them to attempt killing any living thing in sight, including members of their own species. This "kill rage" can be contagious and spread from one Predator to another, driving them all to attack each other. The Predators as a species barely survived the wars provoked by their kill glands, and they have learned to control the gland's secretions with artificial hormone regulators.

In Ian Edginton and Alex Maleev's graphic novel Aliens vs. Predator: Eternal and the videogame Predator: Concrete Jungle, Predator flesh and blood, if consumed, is shown to have the capacity of greatly lengthening a human's lifespan.

Video games

In the first-person shooting video game Call of Duty: Ghosts, Predator appears as a hidden killstreak on the multiplayer map "Ruins" from the Devastation map pack. The player can play as Predator for a brief period by completing a Field Order and obtaining a care package. Predator is also a playable guest character via downloadable content in the fighting game Mortal Kombat X, opposite an Alien.

In the tactical shooting video game Tom Clancy's Ghost Recon Wildlands, a live event titled "The Hunt" was released on December 14, 2017. During this event, players may take part in a bonus campaign mission in the Caimanes district to battle the Predator, with the event lasting until January 2018.

In the 2020 videogame Predator: Hunting Grounds, the predator race appears as one of two playable factions in an asymmetric competitive multiplayer game called 'Hunt' mode. The game mode pits a single, player-controlled predator against four player-controlled, Human spec-ops soldiers called the "fireteam" which is designed to resemble the scenario of the first Predator movie. The premise is that the predator player's only goal is to 'hunt' the fireteam from a 3rd person perspective preventing their escape from the game environment before the time limit expires. This is accomplished using an array of predator weapons and abilities taken straight from the film and comic books, While the human fireteam must work together to complete a series of objectives and escape without being slain by the Predator or hostile AI units playing from a generic, first-person tactical shooter perspective. When the mission begins, the characters themselves are unaware that a predator is conducting a hunt in the same area as their mission, and sets the narrative for why the two factions come to blows. The game itself is a spiritual successor to the original movies, and tells a narrative through a number of fully voice-acted cassette tapes. These fill in the gaps in the timeline and tie certain characters and events from the series together such as "Dutch" (Arnold Schwarzenegger, Predator 1987); Sean Keyes (Jake Busey; The Predator 2018), son of Peter Keyes (Gary Busey, Predator 2 1990); and Isabelle (Alice Braga, Predators 2010). These tapes are fully voiced by the original actors. What the Schwarzenegger's character had been up to between the events of the 1987 "Val-Verde incident", and the game's current narrative set in 2025 is explained in a free-DLC in the form of in-game tape recordings voiced by Schwarzenegger. In 2025 Dutch is in his late 70's, but his life has been extended unintentionally by administering him with captured predator medical-tech. His strength and physical stature are that of a man of 40 years old. After the events of the original film, Dutch devoted his life to hunting down and killing predators, and now acts in the capacity as a consultant and mercenary in the employ of the OWLF ("Other Worldly Life Forms").

A Predator and its ship made a guest appearance in Fortnite Battle Royale as a mystery skin for the Chapter 2 Season 5 Battle Pass. One of the many iconic hunters attempted to be hired as part of Agent Jones' initiative to maintain order inside the game, the Predator could not be convinced, instead opting to hunt Jones himself. After accidentally following Jones through a rift into the Fortnite world, the Predator set himself up inside a jungle compound, and is "eager to sample all the new prey the island has to offer".

In the side-scrolling shooter Broforce, the Predator appears as a playable character known as the Brodator. Like the Predator, he uses his signature wrist blades but also uses throwing spears as a ranged weapon. His special skill lets him turn invisible and upon putting in certain button inputs, he can explode before properly dying.

See also 
 Alien (creature in Alien franchise)

References

External links 

 Predator Females at Alien vs. Predator Central

Predator (franchise) characters
Alien vs. Predator (franchise) characters
Horror film villains
Science fiction film characters
Extraterrestrial characters in films
Extraterrestrial supervillains
Fictional characters with superhuman strength
Fictional extraterrestrial life forms
Fictional mass murderers
Fictional monsters
Fictional professional hunters
Fictional warrior races
Film characters introduced in 1987
Fictional predators
Fictional characters who can turn invisible
Action film villains
Hunting in film
Fictional suicide attacks